Tellurium hexafluoride is the inorganic compound of tellurium and fluorine with the chemical formula TeF6. It is a colorless, highly toxic gas with an unpleasant odor.

Preparation 
Tellurium hexafluoride can be prepared by treating tellurium with fluorine gas at 150 °C. It can also be prepared by fluorination of TeO3 with bromine trifluoride. Upon heating, TeF4 disproportionates to give TeF6 and Te.

Properties 
Tellurium hexafluoride is a highly symmetric octahedral molecule.  Its physical properties resemble those of the hexafluorides of sulfur and selenium.  It is less volatile, however, due to the increase in polarizability.  At temperatures below −38 °C, tellurium hexafluoride condenses to a volatile white solid.

Reactivity 
Unlike SF6, tellurium hexafluoride is not chemically inert. For example, TeF6 slowly hydrolyzes to Te(OH)6:
TeF6 + 6 H2O → Te(OH)6 + 6 HF
Treatment of tellurium hexafluoride with tetramethylammonium fluoride (Me4NF) gives, sequentially, the hepta- and octafluorides:
TeF6 + Me4NF → Me4NTeF7
Me4NTeF7 + Me4NF → (Me4N)2TeF8

Further sources 
W.C. Cooper, Tellurium, Van Nostrand Reinhold Company, New York, USA, 1971.
K.W. Bagnall, The Chemistry of Selenium, Tellurium and Polonium, Elsevier Publishing, New York, 1966.
R.T. Sanderson, Chemical Periodicity, Reinhold, New York, USA, 1960.
F. A. Cotton, G. Wilkinson, C.A. Murillo, and M. Bochmann; Advanced Inorganic Chemistry, John Wiley & Sons, 1999.
G.J. Hathaway, N.H. Proctor, Chemical Hazards of the Workplace, 5th edition, Wiley-Interscience, New Jersey, 2004.

References

External links 
 Web Elements
 OSHA
 CDC – NIOSH Pocket Guide to Chemical Hazards

Tellurium halides
Hexafluorides
Octahedral compounds
Foul-smelling chemicals
Tellurium(VI) compounds